Tennessee Wesleyan University (TWU) is a private Methodist university in Athens, Tennessee.  It was founded in 1857 and is affiliated with the Holston Conference of the United Methodist Church. It maintains a branch campus in Knoxville, where it offers evening programs in business administration. It also conducts its nursing classes in Knoxville.

History

Tennessee Wesleyan was founded in 1857 as Athens Female College. It consisted solely of one building (now Old College). At that time, the college was one of only a handful of coeducational colleges in the Southern United States.

In 1889, it merged with Chattanooga University to form  (U.S. Grant University;  being Grant's given names), becoming the consolidated university's Athens branch campus.
Seventeen years later (1906), it was renamed the Athens School of the University of Chattanooga.

In 1925, the college split from Chattanooga to become Tennessee Wesleyan College and served as a junior college.  Tennessee Wesleyan became a liberal arts college in 1957 when it began awarding bachelor's degrees.

In February 2016, the school announced that they would change their name to Tennessee Wesleyan University, effective July 1, 2016. The decision would be the first name change for the school in 91 years.

Academics

Articulation agreements
Tennessee Wesleyan University has articulation agreements with Chattanooga State Community College, Cleveland State Community College, Motlow State Community College, Pellissippi State Community College, Roane State Community College, and Walters State Community College.

Degrees
Tennessee Wesleyan University offers Bachelor of Arts and Bachelor of Science degrees in Behavioral Science, Biology, Business Administration, Chemistry, Communication, Criminal Justice, Early Human Development and Learning, Education, English, Exercise Science, Fine Art (Visual Art and Theatre), Music, individualized majors, History, Human Services, International Studies, Mathematics, Nursing, Psychology, Church Vocations, Pre-Seminary, Sociology, Social Work, and Special Education.

Admissions and rankings

Tennessee Wesleyan University accepts 62% of all applicants and is considered "selective" by U.S. News & World Report.

Athletics

The Tennessee Wesleyan athletic teams are called the Bulldogs. The university is a member of the National Association of Intercollegiate Athletics (NAIA), primarily competing in the Appalachian Athletic Conference (AAC) since the 2001–02 academic year.

Tennessee Wesleyan competes in 21 intercollegiate varsity sports: Men's sports include baseball, basketball, bowling, cross country, golf, lacrosse, soccer, tennis, track & field and volleyball; while women's sports include basketball, bowling, cross country, golf, lacrosse, soccer, softball, tennis, track & field and volleyball; and co-ed sports include cheerleading and eSports.

Baseball
The university's baseball team has won the NAIA World Series 2 times (2012, 2019) as well as 24 conference championships and 12 conference tournament championships.

Notable alumni

 Tom Browning, baseball player
 Ron Campbell, baseball player
 Chris Cattaneo, soccer player
 James Alexander Fowler, U.S. Assistant Attorney General and Knoxville mayor
 Aaron Grant, American football player
 Leonard Lomell, decorated soldier, attorney, businessman
 John T. Raulston, judge in the 1925 Scopes trial
 Carol Aebersold, co-author of The Elf on the Shelf

References

External links
 Official website
 Official athletics website

 01
Methodist universities and colleges in the United States
Private universities and colleges in Tennessee
Buildings and structures in McMinn County, Tennessee
Former women's universities and colleges in the United States
Education in Knox County, Tennessee
Education in McMinn County, Tennessee
Methodism in Tennessee
Educational institutions established in 1857
1857 establishments in Tennessee
Appalachian Athletic Conference schools
History of women in Tennessee